Yeşilyurt is a  town in Islahiye district of Gaziantep Province, Turkey. In 2012, the population of Yeşilyurt was 3640. The town was founded in 1991 as a result of merging three villages named Dolan, Yenioba and Alagöz. Major economic activities of the town are Viticulture and  peach gardening.

References

Populated places in Gaziantep Province
Towns in Turkey
İslahiye District